Lyon Mountain is a hamlet and census-designated place located in the town of Dannemora in Clinton County, New York, United States. The population was 423 at the 2010 census.

The northern slopes of Lyon Mountain are in the southern part of the community, with the  summit to the south in the town of Saranac.

The Lyon Mountain Correctional Facility, a minimum security prison, was located in the community. The facility closed in 2011, and has been purchased by a Canadian who has mined sand for hydrofracking from the site.

Geography
The hamlet of Lyon Mountain is located at  (44.728863, -73.907905).

Lyon Mountain is on New York State Route 374, which leads east  to Dannemora village and northwest  to Chateaugay.

Demographics

As of the census of 2000, there were 458 people, 214 households, and 129 families residing in the hamlet. The population density was 45.0 per square mile (17.4/km2). There were 234 housing units at an average density of 23.0/sq mi (8.9/km2). The racial makeup of the CDP was 95.85% White, 0.22% African American, 1.09% Native American, 0.22% Pacific Islander, and 2.62% from two or more races.

There were 214 households, out of which 22.0% had children under the age of 18 living with them, 47.2% were married couples living together, 8.9% had a female householder with no husband present, and 39.3% were non-families. 36.0% of all households were made up of individuals, and 22.9% had someone living alone who was 65 years of age or older. The average household size was 2.14 and the average family size was 2.72.

In the community, the population was spread out, with 18.3% under the age of 18, 5.7% from 18 to 24, 22.5% from 25 to 44, 30.6% from 45 to 64, and 22.9% who were 65 years of age or older. The median age was 46 years. For every 100 females, there were 93.2 males. For every 100 females age 18 and over, there were 85.1 males.

The median income for a household in the village was $25,000, and the median income for a family was $41,250. Males had a median income of $39,688 versus $20,250 for females. The per capita income for the CDP was $16,776. About 14.8% of families and 14.1% of the population were below the poverty line, including 21.7% of those under age 18 and 7.7% of those age 65 or over.

History

The hamlet is named after Nathaniel Lyon, who moved to the base of the mountain that also bears his name in 1803 and died circa 1850. Lyon was a relative of General Nathaniel Lyon (1818–1861).

Industry
Republic Steel Corporation was one of the last major steel firms to use low-phosphorus Adirondack magnetites, operating the Chateaugay Ore & Iron Company from 1939 to 1967. Lyon Mountain's iron ore was considered the best in the industry and was the material of choice for John Roebling and Sons in the construction of the Brooklyn Bridge. In later years, Roebling used Lyon Mountain ore in the construction of the George Washington Bridge and the Golden Gate Bridge.

Government
Lyon Mountain is a hamlet within the town of Dannemora. Public services and government affairs are administered by the town, which is governed by a board of councilors.

Sports
Lyon Mountain is the home of the Lyon Mountain Miners who play in the Champlain Valley Baseball League. They play at the famous Big Ball Field, a major league-sized park in the heart of Lyon Mountain.

See also
Lyon Mountain Railroad Station

References

External links
 Bloated Toe Enterprises Publishers website on Lyon Mountain
 

Hamlets in New York (state)
Census-designated places in New York (state)
Census-designated places in Clinton County, New York
Hamlets in Clinton County, New York
Mining communities in New York (state)
Iron mines in the United States